Dr. A. D. S. N. Prasad is the founder of Pathway Centers for Children, a non-profit  and non governmental organization located in Chennai and other rural parts of Tamil Nadu, India, that is dedicated to the welfare of children with mental handicap and those who are destitute or otherwise disadvantaged.

Pathway Centers for Children 
As a 22-year-old speech pathologist and audiologist, Prasad learned that to pay for his professional services clients quite often would have to sell everything they had and would make great sacrifices. Impressed by this, he eventually started giving free services to whoever needed it.

Prasad established Pathway with a motive to help those were underprivileged and disadvantaged in the society.

Writing 
A biography on Prasad's, life "Prasad Enroru Thai"was released in October 2008.

Awards 
  Award for "Services Rendered to the Mentally Disabled" Council of Parent's Association of the Mentally Retarded, Chennai 2002.
 "Vocational Excellence" Award to A.D.S.N. Prasad for his services to the Disabled - Rotary Club International, 1999.
 1998 Award for "Most Outstanding Institution in India Serving the Disabled" and "Most Outstanding Employer of the Disabled in India" - Prime Minister of India, Mr. Atal Bihari Vajpayee.
 "Best Institution Serving the Disabled" - Chief Minister of Tamil Nadu, Ms. J. Jayalalithaa, 1995.
 "Best Employer of the Disabled" - Social Welfare Minister, Government of Tamil Nadu, 1995.'
 "Best Employees" awarded to two Special Pathway Employees - Social Welfare Minister, Government of Tamil Nadu, 1995.
 "Exceptional Contribution for Services to People" Government of Karnataka, 1995.
 "Services Rendered to the Mentally Disabled in India" - Japanese SIVUS Council, 1993.

References

External links
 Pathway Centers for Children
 Prasad's only Pathway
 MSDS awards for Women Social Workers
 Paving Way for Inclusive Education
 Biography Released

20th-century Indian businesspeople
1952 births
Living people
Businesspeople from Chennai
Rural community development
Businesspeople from Mysore